is a centerless non-rotating Ferris wheel at Tokyo Dome City in Bunkyo, Tokyo, Japan. Tokyo's largest roller coaster, the  Thunder Dolphin, passes through the centre of the wheel.

Big O was constructed by Mitsubishi Heavy Industries. Construction was completed in March 2003, and the ferris wheel was opened to the public in May 2003. Big O was listed as the world's first centreless Ferris wheel by Guinness World Records.

Joysound karaoke machines were added to eight of its forty gondolas in August 2017.

References

External links
 Tokyo Dome City: Attractions

Ferris wheels in Japan